Wajahat Ather Mirza is an Indian politician who is serving as a Member of the Maharashtra Legislative Assembly representing Indian National Congress since 10 July 2018 when he was elected unopposed with 10 others to the Maharashtra Legislative Council.

References

Indian National Congress politicians from Maharashtra
Living people
1975 births